Oropioi is a former municipality in East Attica, Greece. Population 9,223 (2011). The seat of the municipality was in the town Skala Oropou. Since the 2011 local government reform it is part of the municipality Oropos, of which it is a municipal unit. The municipal unit has an area of 32.890 km2. The municipality Oropioi consisted of the municipal districts (now communities) Oropos, Nea Palatia and Skala Oropou.

References

Populated places in East Attica
Oropos